The following is a list of 2017 box office number-one films in South Korea. When the number-one film in gross is not the same as the number-one film in admissions, both are listed.

Highest-grossing films
As of December 31, 2017

 *Continue to screening in 2018
 **Admissions showed was not total admissions, but admissions by the last day of the year.

See also
List of South Korean films of 2017

References

2017
South Korea
2017 in South Korean cinema